Holyoke is a city in Hampden County, Massachusetts, United States.

Holyoke may also refer to:
Holyoke, Colorado, a home rule municipality in Phillips County, Colorado
Holyoke Publishing, an American comic book publisher
Holyoke Range, a traprock mountain range in Massachusetts
Mount Holyoke, a mountain in the Holyoke Range
Elizur Holyoke, namesake of Holyoke, Massachusetts
Keith Holyoake, a former Prime Minister of New Zealand
a fictional place
Holyoke station, an Amtrak station
Holyoke Heritage State Park
Holyoke Automobile Company

See also
Holyoake, a surname
Holyoak, a surname
Holyoke Blue Sox, a baseball team in Holyoke, Massachusetts
Holyoke Millers, a baseball team in Holyoke, Massachusetts
Holyoke Community College, a college in Holyoke, Massachusetts
Holyoke Mall at Ingleside, a mall in Holyoke, Massachusetts
Mount Holyoke College, a liberal arts college in South Hadley, Massachusetts